The Czech Sport Aircraft Sky Cruiser is a single engine high wing conventional landing gear aircraft in development by Czech Sport Aircraft.

Specifications

References

See also
CZAW SportCruiser

Single-engined tractor aircraft
High-wing aircraft
2010s Czech sport aircraft